Left Unity is a group of left wing students' organisations in Jawaharlal Nehru University. It was formed with aim to counter the growing influence of  right wing students organization like  ABVP, a students front of Rashtriya Swayamsevak Sangh. Left Unity predominantly consists of four major students organisations -  AISF, AISA,  SFI, and DSF. The panel of Left Unity has been winning the election of Jawaharlal Nehru University Students' Union for the four consecutive years.

References 

Student politics in India